Pop Galaxy is a 2010 Magnus Carlsson studio album.

Track listing
CD1 The Album
 My Galaxy  (03:17)
 The Best in Me  (02:55)
 Feel You  (03:36)
 The Kiss  (04:11)
 Keep On Dancin'  (03:46)
 A Little Respect  (03:32)
 Show Me The Way  (02:57)
 Doin' OK Doin' Alright  (04:01)
 Stronger Than Ever  (03:02)
 One Love To Give  (04:15)
 This Is Disco (Pitchline International Version)  (04:22)
 When Our Love Is Gone  (03:55)
 Take Me To Your Heart  (03:17)
 Last One To Stand  (03:12)

CD2 Bonus Disc
 Crying At The Discoteque  (03:42)
 Walking In My Shoes  (03:11)
 Money (Greedy Honey)  (03:08)
 Flash (French-language version of "One Love To Give")  (04:15)
 This Is Disco (Single Version)  (03:46)
 Feel You (Pitchline Club Remake)  (06:39)
 A Little Respect (Pitchline Remix)  (06:40)
 This Is Disco (SoundFactory Paradise Anthem)  (07:04)
 Feel You (Ruff & Jam Club Mix)  (07:05)
 Video: Feel You
 Video: A Little Respect
 Video: Making The Video "Feel You"

Digital release
The digital release includes the song "Slave to Love" but misses "Walking in My Shoes" and the three videos.

Charts

References

2010 albums
Magnus Carlsson albums